Sir Charles James Antrobus  (14 May 1933 – 3 June 2002) was the Governor-General of St. Vincent and the Grenadines from 1 June 1996 until his death. Antrobus was a master of the St. George’s Masonic Lodge, and spent most of his working life in Cable & Wireless plc.

He died in Toronto and was temporarily replaced by Monica Dacon.

References

1933 births
2002 deaths
Knights Grand Cross of the Order of St Michael and St George
Officers of the Order of the British Empire
Governors-General of Saint Vincent and the Grenadines
Freemasons